"I, Robot" is an episode of the original The Outer Limits television show. It first aired on 14 November 1964, during the second season. It was remade under the same title in 1995. Leonard Nimoy appeared in both versions.

Opening narration

Plot
Defence attorney Thurman Cutler is coaxed out of retirement to take the case for the defence of a robot, Adam Link, against the charge that it willfully murdered its creator Dr. Charles Link. Placed on trial, Adam sits alone in the courtroom, apart from his only friend Nina Link, the professor's niece. Testimony reveals that once Adam was activated he began a trial and error process of learning like that of a child. This suggests that some of his later acts, construed as violent, were in fact a matter of the mechanical man not understanding his own strength, or subtle or vague areas of human thought and emotions.  Unfortunately the defence never fully recovers from the revelation that Adam read the novel Frankenstein while absorbing all the books in the Doc's library, and the judge pronounces the robot guilty, even though the Doc's death was accidental. Before Adam can be hauled away to be dismantled, he breaks free of his bonds outside the courthouse to throw a child aside from the path of an oncoming truck, but is smashed into scrap metal in the process. Cutler notes sardonically: "That terrible monster won't ever harm anybody again."

Closing narration

Background
The Adam Link stories first appeared in Amazing Stories magazine between 1939 and 1942, written by Eando Binder, a pseudonym used jointly by brothers Earl and Otto Binder, (though only Otto wrote the Adam Link stories). Unusually for a robot at that time, Adam was a sympathetic character with genuine emotions, and the tales were narrated by Adam himself. "I Robot" first appeared in Amazing Stories  Vol. 13/no. 1 (January 1939), and was continued in "The Trial of Adam Link, Robot" (Amazing Stories vol. 13/no. 7 (July 1939)).  The original story ends with Adam intending to turn himself off, believing he will not be allowed a trial, and although innocent, writing his confession.

The Outer Limits episode is based on these first two stories. In this TV adaptation, writer Robert C. Dennis invented the character of attorney Thurman Cutler, greatly expanded the role of a nameless newspaperman, mentioned only in passing in Binder's original story, into Judson Ellis and changed Prof. Link's relative to a woman.  The ending was also changed so that Adam is found guilty, ending up as scrap metal when saving a child from being hit by a truck outside the courthouse; in the original "Trial" story, he is vindicated and set free.

Unlike his TV counterpart, the original Adam Link was a six-foot-tall android. In the following four stories ("Adam Link in Business", Vol. 14/no. 1, Jan 1940; "Adam Link's Vengeance", Vol. 14/no. 2,Feb 1940; "Adam Link, Robot Detective", Vol. 14/no. 5, May 1940; and "Adam Link, Champion Athlete", Vol.14/no. 7, Jul 1940) he amasses a fortune as a business consultant, enough to fund a rejuvenation of slum areas and build a "female" robot named Eve to be his wife, is betrayed by a friend who uses him to rob banks, becomes a private detective to find the person who framed Eve for 3 murders and performs a series of athletic challenges. The later stories, ("Adam Link fights a War", Vol.14/no. 12, Dec 1940; "Adam Link in the Past", Vol.15.no. 2,Feb 1941; "Adam Link Faces A Revolt", Vol. 15/no. 5, May 1941; and "Adam Link Saves The World", Vol.16/no.4,Apr 1942) were more outlandish SF adventure tales with Adam and Eve fighting evil robots and aliens in defense of the human race. All 10 stories were adapted by Otto Binder into a 174-page novel Adam Link: Robot, and first published in the US by Paperback Library in 1965.

"I, Robot" first appeared in color comic strip form in 1954 in EC Comics Weird Science-Fantasy #27, followed by "The Trial of Adam Link" in #28 and "Adam Link in Business" in #29, all adapted by Albert Feldstein, with art by Joe Orlando. Later an irregular series of black and white Adam Link comic strips, written by Otto Binder and drawn by Joe Orlando, were published in Warren Magazines' Creepy between 1965 and 1967 ("I, Robot", #2 Apr 1965; "The Trial Of Adam Link!", #4 Aug 1965; "Adam Link in Business", #6 Dec 1965; "Adam Link's Mate!", #8 Apr 1966; "Adam Link's Vengeance!", #9 Jun 1966; "Adam Link, Robot Detective!", #12 Dec 1966; 'Adam Link Gangster!", #13 Feb 1967; "Adam Link, Champion Athlete", #15 Aug 1967).

Cast

See also
Adam Link
I, Robot (short story)
I, Robot (1995 The Outer Limits)

References

External links

The Outer Limits (1963 TV series season 2) episodes
1964 American television episodes
Television episodes about robots
Television episodes based on short fiction